The Pontiac V8 engine is a family of overhead valve 90° V8 engines manufactured by the Pontiac Division of General Motors Corporation between 1955 and 1981. The engines feature a cast-iron block and head and two valves per cylinder. Engine block and cylinder heads were cast at Saginaw Metal Casting Operations then assembled at Tonawanda Engine before delivery to Pontiac Assembly for installation.

In the 1960s the popular  version, which had helped establish the Pontiac GTO as a premier muscle car, was cut in half to produce an unusual, high-torque inline four economy engine, the Trophy 4.

Unusual for a major automaker, Pontiac did not have the customary "small-block" and "big-block" engine families common to other GM divisions, Ford, and Chrysler. Effectively, Pontiac's V8s were all small blocks, sharing the same connecting rod length 6.625 in (168.3 mm) (except for the later short deck 301 and 265 produced in the late 1970s and early 1980s before Pontiac adopted universal GM engines).

The V8 was phased out in 1981, replaced by GM "corporate engines" such as the Chevrolet 305 cu in small block V8.

History

Pre-development
Pontiac began as a "companion make" to the Oakland division of the General Motors line of automobiles in 1926. Pontiac successfully competed against more-expensive inline four-cylinder models with their inline flathead six-cylinder engines. After outselling Oakland, Pontiac became the sole survivor of the two by 1932. In addition to the inline 6, Pontiac used the Oakland V8 for one year, 1932, debuting the Pontiac straight-8 engine in 1933. The two inline engines were used through 1954, when Pontiac unveiled its OHV Strato Streak V8 in 1955. The development of this V8 dates back to 1946, when engineers began considering new engine designs for postwar cars. They came up with a  L-head design. The results showed Pontiac that an L-head  simply couldn't compete with an overhead valve engine.

Despite their work, the division's conservative management saw no immediate need to replace the Pontiac Straight-8 until later in the 1950s. The concept car Pontiac Strato-Streak was used to introduce the V8 and in later years the engine was installed in Pontiac products.

Development
By 1949 work on a  OHV V8 had begun, but moved along slowly. When Robert Critchfield took over as general manager in 1952, he launched an ambitious plan to move Pontiac into the upscale, mid-range market occupied by Oldsmobile, and that demanded V8 power. A new engine was fast-tracked, its relatively late start allowing it to take advantage of developments proven in the Oldsmobile V8 and Cadillac V8. As a result, it was remarkably free of teething problems. During 1951–1952, Pontiac had 23  V8-equipped 1953 model production prototypes running tests on the GM proving grounds. Pontiac planned to produce the 1953 models with the V8, but Buick and Oldsmobile appealed to GM management and earned a 2-year delay.

The main innovation of the Pontiac engine was reverse-flow cooling and the stamped rocker-arm system, which had been devised by Pontiac engineer Clayton Leach in 1948. At the request of Ed Cole, general manager of Chevrolet, the layout was also used by the Chevrolet V8 released in 1955, an exception to the customary GM policy of allowing a division one year of exclusive use of an internally developed advance.

Pontiac continued to manufacture its own engines, distinct from Buick, Cadillac, Chevrolet, or Oldsmobile, until 1981. Pontiac engines were used in its U.S.-market cars; Canadian-built Pontiac automobiles generally used Chevrolet engines. From 1955 through 1959, the Pontiac V8 was also used in some GMC pick-up trucks. Federal emissions standards and the drive towards "corporate" engines shared among all GM divisions led to the progressive demise of the Pontiac V8 through the late 1970s.

Design
The 1955-up Pontiac V8 that finally reached the public was an overhead valve engine with cast iron cylinder heads and block and wedge-shaped combustion chambers. An innovative design feature was mounting the rocker arms on ball pivots on studs set into the cylinder head, rather than using a separate rocker shaft. Along with being cheaper to build, this allowed more consistent valve action with less weight than a conventional shaft.

All Pontiac V8s from 1955 to 1959 were reverse cooled, known as the "gusher" cooling system. It was removed from the design for the 1960 model year because designers moved the generator and the power steering pump from atop the front of the engine down to the front of the heads to accommodate a lower hoodline. However, the 1959 389 engines had the generator in front of the heads with reverse flow cooling still in use.

Pontiac differed from other GM Divisions and most other manufacturers in producing only a single small block V8, rather than adding a larger big block to its line-up. Engine displacement is a function of bore and stroke. Pontiac's V8s share the same  connecting rod length, with the exceptions of the later short deck 301, 265, and 303 Ram Air V.

Most Pontiac engines were painted light blue. The 1958 370" engine and the 1959–60 389 version was named the "Tempest" V-8 and changed in 61 to the "Trophy" V8. Pontiac in the 1950s was one of a few US manufacturers that did not regularly identify their engine names and sizes with air-cleaner or valve-cover decals.

Small-journal engines:1955-1981

287
The V8 engine was introduced for the 1955 model year as the "Strato Streak". Not long before the model year introduction, Pontiac management decided that the entire line would be V8-powered. This was based on results of over 1 million test miles, which was unheard of at the time. It was rated  @ 4600 rpm and  @ 2400 rpm with a two-barrel carburetor,  @ 4600 rpm and  @ 2800 rpm with the four-barrel carburetor.

317
It was offered in the following forms:

(with manual transmission)
 Two-barrel carburetor, 7.9:1 compression,  @ 4400 rpm,  @ 2800 rpm
 Four-barrel carburetor, 8.9:1 compression,  @ 4800 rpm,  @ 2800 rpm

(with Hydramatic)
 Two-barrel carburetor, 8.9:1 compression,  @ 4600 rpm,  @ 2600 rpm
 Four-barrel carburetor, 8.9:1 compression,  @ 4800 rpm,  @ 3000 rpm
 Two four-barrel carburetors, 10.5:1 compression,  @ 5100 rpm,  @ 2600 rpm.

347

For the first time, Pontiac offered Tri-Power, three two-barrel carburetors with a sequential linkage (replacing the previous dual-quad set-up). Power ratings increased accordingly:

(with manual transmission)
 Two-barrel carburetor, 8.5:1 compression,  @ 4600 rpm,  @ 2300 rpm
 Four-barrel carburetor, 10:1 compression,  @ 4800 rpm,  @ 2600 rpm

(with Hydramatic)
 Two-barrel carburetor, 10.0:1 compression,  @ 4800 rpm,  @ 2600 rpm
 Four-barrel carburetor, 10.25:1 compression,  @ 4800 rpm,  @ 2900 rpm
 Three two-barrel carburetors, 10.75:1 compression,  @ 5000 rpm,  @ 2800 rpm.

Standard only for the Pontiac Bonneville was Pontiac's first-ever fuel injection system. A mechanical system built by Rochester, it was similar in principle, but not identical, to the contemporary Chevrolet "fuelie". Contemporary road tests suggest that it was actually somewhat inferior to the Tri-Power engines, although it did have better fuel economy. Only 630 Bonnevilles were produced for 1957, all of them fuel-injected.

370
The engine was dubbed the TEMPEST V-8, a nickname it retained until the end of 1960.

The fuel-injected engine became an option on any Pontiac model, carrying a staggering price tag of $500 (almost 15% of the car's base price). It was rated at  @ 4800 rpm and  @ 3,000 rpm on 10.5:1 compression. Only about 400 were produced before the fuel injection system was quietly dropped.

389

This was the beginning of factory supplied performance items such as 4 bolt main bearings and windage trays to reduce friction from crankcase oil. The 389 was the standard engine for the Pontiac Grand Prix and Pontiac Bonneville and installed in the Pontiac GTO through 1966. Beginning in 1961 the Pontiac V-8 (389 and 421) was dubbed the Trophy V-8, due to its many victories in racing.

Trophy 4
Perhaps the most unusual variation of the Pontiac V8 was the 1961-63 Trophy 4, which was a 45-degree inclined  inline-4 created from the right bank of the 389 for the debut of the Tempest.

326/336

In 1963 Pontiac dropped the Buick division built 215 cu. in. aluminum V8 it had offered in the Tempest and replaced it with a small-bore version of the standard  Pontiac V8. Both used a single two-barrel carburetor. The 326 subsequently became the optional V8 engine for Tempests, and later the Pontiac Firebird, through 1967 and maintained the 17 degree cylinder head valve angle for its entire production run.

A higher-output four-barrel carburetor version was offered, called the 326 HO (High Output).

400

The 400 remained in production through the 1978 model year, with 1979 cars receiving engines produced the previous year.

In basic 2-barrel form it produced 290 horsepower and 428 ft. pounds of torque in 1968.  This was the engine installed in the Pontiac Executive line of large cars and its largest station wagon, the Pontiac Safari.

In 1967, the cylinder head design was improved for the 400 4-barrel engine. The valve angle was reduced from 17 degrees to 14 degrees for better breathing. 1967 was the last year for closed-chambered heads. The "670" head was a 1967-only casting, and the only PMD head to have a closed chamber with the new 14 degree valve angle. The 400 2-barrel kept the 17 degree valve angles for '67; starting in '68 all Pontiac V8s went to the 14 degree valve angle. Pontiac went to open-chambered heads in some 1967 models and all 68 and up to improve power, engine breathing and reduce emissions. The valve size increased as well, to  intake and  exhaust valves on high-performance heads. Low-performance and two-barrel applications, the standard engine in full-sized Pontiacs, got  intake and  exhaust valves and pressed in rocker arm studs.

The four-barrel 400 was a popular performance option for many of Pontiac's cars. When fitted with other high-airflow components, it produced a good balance of low-end torque and higher-RPM power.  In the 1968 Pontiac GTO it was given a 10.75:1 compression ratio and tuned to deliver 360 horsepower and 445 foot-pounds of torque.

350
Like the 326, it was offered in both 2-barrel and 4-barrel versions. In 1968, a  HO option was offered in the Tempest and Firebird.

Applications:
 1968-1977 Pontiac Firebird
 1968-1977 Pontiac LeMans
 1968-1981 Pontiac Parisienne
 1968-1970 Pontiac Tempest
 1969 Pontiac Custom S
 1971-1977 Pontiac Catalina
 1972-1975 Pontiac Ventura
 1973-1977 Pontiac Grand Prix
 1974 Pontiac GTO
 1978 Pontiac Grand Safari

303

301
The  301 was offered from 1977 to 1981 and also installed in other GM cars during those years. Based in part on designs for the "short deck"  engine designed for the 1970 racing season, it had a shorter deck than the big V8, and used thin-wall castings to reduce weight. The crankshafts were also unique in the fact that they featured only two counter weights instead of the usual five and also featured lightened connecting rod journals. This resulted in a lightweight design weighing less than the Chevrolet small-block V-8. The heads were a new design featuring siamesed intake ports. The short-deck block and different intake ports also required the design of a new intake manifold. Although it is much different from the original 1955-vintage Pontiac V-8 powerplant, the 301 has the distinction of being the last true Pontiac V-8 engine, as Pontiac ceased production of these engines effective April 1, 1981.

From 1977 to 1981 there were 4 distinct 301 versions:
 301 2-barrel, (5th character of the VIN is a "Y" for 1977-1979).
 301 4-barrel, (5th character of the VIN is a "W" for 1978-1980, and the 8th for 1981).
 301 4-barrel 'W72' or 'ESC' (with the 5th character of the VIN being a "W" for 1979-1980 and the 8th for 1981).
 301 Turbo, (with the 5th VIN character being a "T". for 1980, and the 8th being a "T" for 1981).

For 1981 model year vehicles, the engine codes are the 8th digit of the VIN. The 2-barrel version was last offered in 1979. The 4-barrel version was available from 1978 to 1981 and the Turbo version was limited to the 1980 and 1981 model year, however, it was originally intended to be available for the 3rd generation Firebird before its cancellation by GM.

301 Turbo

The 301 Turbo was unique since it had a beefier block than the 1977–79 versions (which carried on in the non-turbo versions in 1980 and 1981), a very mild camshaft with  lift and 250 degrees gross duration, a  oil pump to ensure adequate oil to the oil-cooled Garrett TBO-305 Turbocharger, a rolled fillet crankshaft, a fully baffled oil pan, and a specific  Quadrajet carburetor. This had extra-rich "DX" secondary metering rods and a remote vacuum source for the primary metering rod enrichment circuit to allow the Power Enrichment Vacuum Regulator (PEVR) to release the primary metering rods to move to the up position (enrichment) anytime during boosted conditions. This was to ensure there was enough fuel to cool the cast offset dished pistons.

The 301 Turbo package mandated air conditioning, the THM350 (sometimes referred to as the CBC350 in various literature) non-lockup automatic transmission (THM350C lockup in 1981 Trans Ams), and 3.08 rear axle gearing.

301:Naturally Aspirated
 1977-1981 Pontiac Bonneville
 1977-1981 Pontiac Catalina
 1977-1981 Pontiac Firebird
 1977-1981 Pontiac Grand Prix
 1977-1981 Pontiac LeMans
 1977-1981 Pontiac Parisienne
 1978-1980 Pontiac Grand Am
 1978-1981 Buick Century / Regal / LeSabre

301:Turbo
 1980-1981 Pontiac Firebird Formula / Trans Am

265
Based on the same short-deck as the 301, the "LS5"  was offered only in 1980 and 1981. It could only be ordered with a TH200 automatic transmission and a 2bbl configuration. It was implemented as further development of a cost-effective, more fuel efficient V8 derivative of the 301 V8 for the CAFE requirements. It featured a smaller bore of  coupled with the same  stroke of the 301 (same bore and stroke used by Chevrolet when the first small block motor was introduced in 1955). It produced  After 1981, the Pontiac V8 was replaced entirely by the GM "corporate" V8's from Chevrolet and Oldsmobile.

Applications:
 1980-1981 Pontiac Bonneville
 1980-1981 Pontiac Catalina
 1980-1981 Pontiac Firebird
 1980-1981 Pontiac Grand Prix
 1980-1981 Pontiac LeMans
 1980-1981 Pontiac Parisienne
 1980-1981 Buick Century
 1980-1981 Buick Regal
 1980 Oldsmobile 88

Large-journal engines:1961-1976

421

The  was introduced in 1961 as a dealer-installed Super Duty option. Unlike previous enlargements of Pontiac V8s, it did not replace the 389. It featured  main journals (which the legendary Smokey Yunick reputedly left Pontiac's engineering department over). The 421 SD became factory installed in 1962 and in 1963 a street version became available from the factory with a dual four-barrel or three two-barrel Tri-Power carburetion. Modified versions of this engine were extensively used in NASCAR stock car racing and drag racing competition. The premier SD 421 cylinder head was the late 1962-early 1963 casting #9771980 aka "980", featuring a larger  intake port volume, flowing  @ .

The 421 also marked the end of the option for a forged-steel crankshaft. The Armasteel cast crankshaft was the standard hardened cast-iron crankshaft used throughout the entire Pontiac V-8 line until 1967. "Armasteel" was a trademark of pearlitic malleable iron developed by GM's Saginaw Metal Casting Operations around 1936, which was referred to as "locking ball" cast-iron, as opposed to the "flaking" type found in other engines. In 1967, Pontiac moved on to a technologically simpler nodular cast iron (invented in late 1940s) crankshaft, which they used until 1975.

428
Both Chevy and Ford had 427 cu in performance engines, so Pontiac simply referred to its 427 as a 428 to one-up them. It retained the 421's  stroke and  main journal.

The crankshaft in the 428 had a "N" cast on them (designating nodular steel) as opposed to the 421's Armasteel. In 1969, Pontiac also used a revised crankshaft out of a Pearlitic malleable-iron, although it still used the "N" casting letter. This new material had stronger alloys in the iron. All 428 cylinder heads received the 14 degree valve angle, closed chamber only in 67 and open chamber 68 and up.

The 428 was factory installed in large cars only. However, a few dealers would offer them in the GTO or Firebird and do their own installations, such as Royal Pontiac who offered the "Bobcat" conversion. It was replaced by the 455 for the 1970 model year.

455

The horsepower ratings of this era were often dubious, with engines rated higher or lower in output for advertising, political, or insurance purposes. Though listed as slightly less powerful than some high-performance iterations of the 400 (such as the  Ram-Air), the 455 had  of torque, .

The engine was available in all full-size Pontiacs.
 Buick Gran Sport, and  Oldsmobile 442).

Standard in the Firebird Trans Am, it was still a rare engine.

In 1973 a further refined and even stronger but less powerful version, the Super Duty (SD) engine, was planned for Firebird, Grand Am, Le Mans (GTO), and Grand Prix models. The SD-455 used round-port cylinder heads similar to those used on the 1971 and 1972 455 HO, with specific "LS-2" intake and cast-iron exhaust header manifolds. Still, it was the strongest American engine offered that year. Pontiac's initial plans were to use a camshaft with specs identical to the 041 Ram Air IV camshaft, but testing showed emissions, while technically compliant, did not have "cushion" to satisfy Pontiac's emissions engineers, to avoid production variation leading to any non-compliant engines being produced and sold.  Though a change of camshaft would delay production, Pontiac decided to change camshaft, employing one with identical timing to the 744 camshaft, which had been used in the 400 Ram Air(aka Ram Air III) engine with manual transmissions.  As a result, peak horsepower dropped from 310 to 290, though torque increased from 390 to 395 lb. ft.  After the SD-455 was certified with the new cam, it was production-ready but was then further delayed by the EPA mandating Pontiac recertify all of its engines when the EPA discovered that part-throttle emissions exceeded the limits. Thus in March 1973 Pontiac eliminated a timing solenoid that gave full vacuum advance and disabled the EGR valve in high gear after a period of time that happened to exceed the running time of the EPA testing cycle.  Once corrected the SD-455 was recertified and was released for production in late April 1973.  Given how late in the model year it was, Pontiac decided not to incur the costs of recertifying the SD-455 for other models other than the Firebird. Ultimately Pontiac produced only 295 1973 SD-455 Firebirds (252 Trans Am, 43 Formula). For 1974 another 1,001 (943 Trans Am, 58 Formula) were built, after which the SD-455 was discontinued.

An evolution of the RA IV and H.O. designs, the SD-455 was a much improved engine. In addition to the more refined cylinder heads, block casting reinforcements in the lifter galley and main bearing oil pan rail area, it had forged connecting rods with larger  bolts.  Made with a provision for dry sump oiling, it truly was a racing engine, detuned for use in passenger cars.

The 455 was used through 1976 when it, as with many other large displacement engines, was discontinued as manufacturers moved to smaller, more efficient models, even in their full size car lines.

HO engines

326 HO
A higher-output version was offered, called the 326 HO (High Output).

350 HO
In 1968, there was also a 350 "HO" which had increased power with the addition of higher compression #18 heads (#17 and #46 were the most common 2-barrel heads), a four-barrel carburettor and matching intake that was also used on the 400 and 428 engines. There was also the addition of dual exhaust, and for vehicles equipped with a manual transmission, a slightly more aggressive camshaft.

In 1969 the 350 HO was upgraded again with the addition of the 400 HO cam, commonly referred to by enthusiasts as the 068 cam. Also added was the #48 casting number heads with a  chamber for higher compression, along with larger  valves. Free-flowing exhaust manifolds from the 400 Ram Air were used late in the model year.

400 HO
Officially named the Quadra-Power 400 for 1967 and renamed 400 HO for 1968, the 400 HO was first offered for 1967 as the third engine in the GTO line after the automatic-only 400 2-barrel and the standard 400 4-barrel (the 400 HO would not be offered in the Firebird until the 1968 model year). The camshaft was the HO cam with 288/301 duration. It was the top-of-the-line engine unless one opted for the "Ram Air" V-8 derived from it. As Pontiac's 1967 performance brochure said, "You can add the Ram Air induction hood scoop and new high output cam and valve springs to the Quadra-Power 400 for better top end breathing." But the "Ram Air" 400 also mandated steep 4.33:1 gears(or 3.90:1 in Firebird), making the Quadra-Power 400 (400 HO) the top practical street engine option for most drivers. Standard ratio with the 400 was 3.55:1(except 3.36:1 in Firebird for 1969) regardless of transmission(3.23:1 for cars with air conditioning). The 400 HO was offered as an option for 1967-1970 for GTO and 1968-1970 for Firebird. For 1969-1970 GTO the 400 HO included driver operable Ram Air induction and was renamed "400 Ram Air" for 1969 and just "Ram Air" for 1970. In the Firebird Ram Air induction for the 400 HO was a separate option for 1969(included with Trans Am) and included with the engine(optional in Formula; included with Trans Am) in 1970.

400 W72 "T/A 6.6"
At the end of 1976, Pontiac was no longer able to continue production of the 455 (7.5 L) V8 motor due to the tightening emissions requirements. As Pontiac still wanted to offer a performance motor to compete in the performance market, they looked back to the 400 Pontiac and how it could be improved to offer greater performance while meeting CAFE standards.

In 1977 the  T/A 6.6, (RPO code W72) was created to fulfil the performance engine gap in the Pontiac line-up. The W72 offered many improvements over the standard L78 400 Pontiac. One of the key upgrades were the 6x4 heads. The standard head seen on an L78 400 Pontiac was the low compression 6x8 head, while the 6x4 head seen on the W72 had hardened valve seats for a higher RPM operating range, improved air flow, and higher compression. These heads can be distinguished from 6x8 heads through a small stamped "4" on the top of the front boss. The head design was incorporated from the earlier 1970's 350 Pontiac heads, and could satisfy emissions in all states except for high-altitude emissions states and California. The W72 also featured a camshaft with a higher duration, finer tuned 800cfm Rochester Quadrajet, insulated fuel line, larger 60PSI oil pump, chrome valve covers, a larger harmonic balancer, and the "T/A 6.6" Shaker decal.

The W72 engine was standard in all 1977 Pontiac Can Ams (bar the 1977 Can Ams sold in California/High Altitude states which received the L80 Oldsmobile 403) and was optional in all 1977-79 Pontiac Firebird Formula and Trans Am models. The W72 package was a standalone option, and although was discounted when ordered in conjunction with the Y82/Y84/Y88 Special Appearance package, did not come included with Special Edition Trans Ams, it remained an extra cost option. With some WS6 "Trans Am Special Performance Package" bundles in 1978, the W72 engine was incorporated with the WS6 option group and not listed on the dealer order invoice. However, it can easily be determined by examining the cost price of the option, where the package excluding the W72 engine cost $251, and with the engine, cost extra at $324.

All 1977-1978 Trans Ams ordered with the 4-speed Borg Warner Super T-10 manual transmission received the W72 T/A 6.6 engine. There are no manual transmission equipped Trans Ams that came factory with the standard L78 400 motor in 1977-79. The W72 Performance Package also included an upgrade to the rear differential ratio, setting the rear gear ratio to 3.23 for all 1977 and 1979 W72 Firebirds, with the exception being 3.42 for 4-speed equipped W72 Firebirds in 1978 only.

All W72 equipped Trans Ams featured the "T/A 6.6" shaker decal. A common misconception made by enthusiasts was the notion that all Pontiac engine equipped Trans Ams featured the "T/A 6.6" decal on the shaker, however, it was exclusive to the W72 engine that was featured on less than half of all Trans Ams made during this period. All L78 Pontiac 400 equipped cars received the same shaker decal as the L80 Oldsmobile 403, being "6.6 LITRE". This may have been propagated by the only authorized company that is licensed to reproduce these decals not including the "6.6 LITRE" in the Trans Am decal kits, and only including "T/A 6.6" with no extra cost.

For the 1978 model year, Pontiac re-incorporated the earlier thicker cast cast engine block denoted by the cast number 418988 and a "XX" cast into the side of the block. The earlier 1975-78 blocks had metal shaved from the journals and bottom end as well as a decrease in the nickel content of the block in an attempt to decrease the overall weight of the vehicle to help alleviate emissions and cost. By mid-1978, the W72 could no longer be ordered in conjunction with the MX1 3-speed Turbo-Hydramatic 350 automatic transmission, and could only be ordered with the 4-speed manual transmission.

By 1979, Pontiac was no longer allowed to produce the 400 engine as emissions further tightened. Pontiac had prepared for the forthcoming cancellation of the venerable 400 by producing large volumes of the stronger cast "XX" 400 blocks in 1977 that were assembled in 1978, and stockpiled at a warehouse by the assembly plant for later use. The 1979 Firebird model line was the last year for the Pontiac 400, and by this point not only was it required with the 4-speed manual transmission, it also required the WS6 Special Handling Package as mandatory equipment. The W72 was only available for a very short time, with the majority of 1979 model year W72 Firebirds ordered in late 1978. By early 1979, orders for the W72 package were being rejected by dealers as they supply had run dry. Instead, they were substituted with the L80 Oldsmobile 403, or the L37 Pontiac 301 if they still requested a 4-speed transmission. On the invoicing for the 1979 model year Firebirds, they had the option listed as L78, however, every 1979 400 equipped car received a W72 engine.

According to the June 2019 issue of Muscle car Review magazine, during dyno testing performed during that era, the National Hot Rod Association (NHRA) rated this Pontiac W72 400 T/A 6.6 engine at 260 to 280 net horsepower instead of the 220-hp rating published by Pontiac. The 1979 W72/WS6 equipped Trans Am was considered to be one of the overall best performing cars of the decade due to having a powerplant that produced more power than any other competitor on the market at the time with handling equipment to supplement the performance.

421 HO
Pontiac offered this to the public as a streetable version of the 421 SD. The engine came with 543797 (4-barrel) and 9770716 heads for the tri-power and special exhaust manifolds and a 7H cam with 292deg. intake duration and later 1964 L with 288deg intake essentially the same as the 068 cam. #9770716 aka "716" heads featured a 170cc intake port volume, and were considered a milder "street" version of the vaunted SD421 Super Duty heads. These same heads were also used on the 1964 GTO 389 tri-power engines.

428 HO 
This engine was first offered in 1967 as the top engine option in full-size Pontiacs.  It was rated at 376 bhp in 1967 and 390 bhp in 1968 and 1969. For 1967 only Pontiac called this engine the Quadra-Power 428.  It was renamed 428 HO for 1968.

455 HO
1970

The 1970 '455 HO' was a conventional "D" port engine. It was rated at 360 hp @4300 RPM in the GTO and 370 @ 4600 RPM in the Grand Prix and other full-size Pontiacs.  Ram Air induction was optional in the GTO, though power ratings were unchanged.  Late in the model year the Ram Air 455 HO was made an available option for those GTOs with the optional "The Judge" package.

1971
The "455 HO" moniker took on a whole new meaning with the introduction of the 1971 model year;

Intended as a low compression progression from the previous years Ram Air IV engine, all 1971 455 HO engines used a heavy duty 4 bolt main block, round port cylinder heads (casting #197; with 8.4: compression), "Ram Air" style exhaust manifolds, and a two-part aluminum intake manifold.

The 1971 Pontiac 455 HO was Pontiac's first engine to receive a special  Rochester Quadra-jet carburetor with specific jetting.

The 1971 455 HO was available in the Firebird (optional in Formula; standard in Trans Am), the GTO (standard with "The Judge" package), and the 2-door LeMans, LeMans T-37 (including GT-37), and LeMans Sport.  Ram Air induction was optionally available with the 455 HO in the Firebird Formula(standard on Trans Am), GTO (standard with "The Judge" package), and 2-door LeMans Sport when the T41 Endura Styling Option was also ordered.

1972
The 455 HO moniker was again carried over, this time as a near-exact repeat of the 1971 offering, the only changes were the carburetors (they used a conventional  unit this year), and the head castings (casting #7F6).

According to GM mandates horsepower was now rated in net figures as opposed to gross, so on paper the 1972 455 HO appeared to have a significant drop in power, but in fact it was very much the same engine, and performance figures reveal this to be true.

The 1972 455 HO was rated at  @ 4,000 rpm and  @ 3,200 rpm.

The 1972 455 HO was available in the Firebird (optional in Formula; standard in Trans Am) and 2-door LeMans (including those with the GTO option) and LeMans Sport convertible.  Ram Air induction was optionally available with the 455 HO in the Firebird Formula (standard on Trans Am), and the 2-door LeMans (including GTO).

1975
After the 1974 SD455 was dropped the 1975 Firebird's top performance engine was an 'L78' Pontiac .

Pontiac still offered the regular 455 (RPO L75) in its full sized cars, and after a negative public reaction for dropping the 455 engine, it was re-introduced mid-year as an available option for the 1975 Pontiac Trans Am. However, the engine used in these Trans Ams was the same regular production 455 taken from the big body cars Pontiac was producing, and output 200 HP with a torque rating of 330 lb⋅ft at 2,000 rpm.

The 455 HO package was only available to late model year Pontiac Firebird Trans Am's, and was mandatory with a 4-speed transmission. The shaker wore the decals "455 H.O." like the earlier 1971-1972 motor, but it was not the same motor, and featured standard d-port heads with a very conservative camshaft.

The 1975 455 HO package received some negative press/reviews as some buyers expected to see a return of the 1971-1972 engine, and were disappointed when they received the lower output motor. Upon reflection, many did not consider that it was the only large displacement engine still on offer for any performance car on the market, and reconsidered Pontiac's position between the rising CAFE emissions restrictions.

1976
The L75 455 engine continued as an option into the 1976 model year for the Trans Am, however, Pontiac opted to drop the "H.O." moniker from the shaker due to the disappointing public approval as the motor was not deemed to be "High Output".

The 455 was fundamentally the same for the 1976 model year, albeit the shaker decal now just read "455". This was the last run for the 455 (7.5 L) motor from Pontiac, and production ceased on the 455 this year as it could no longer meet the emissions requirements any longer.

301 W72 "T/A 4.9"
While not related to the 400 W72, the concept was the same. The W72 301 was a tuned L37 301 Pontiac V8 with some minor upgrades. All 1980 Trans Ams received this engine as standard with the option to delete this engine choice as a credit option for the standard L37 301. The 1981 rendition of this engine was officially called the 301-EC [EC standing for Electronic Controls] in the 1981 GM factory service manual, removing the need for a W72 option separately as it was now the standard motor, similar to how all W72 engines in 1979 were coded L78.

One of the key modifications over the standard 301 4-barrel was the 301 Turbo block. The 301T block was significantly more durable than the standard 301 block and received a thicker bottom end. This included the ESC (Electronic Spark Control) distributor and controller borrowed from the 301 Turbo, which allowed for higher timing without the penalty of engine damaging pinging or preignition. A larger  ram air flex duct to the air cleaner from the left-hand fender, specific carburettor calibration for the Rochester Quadrajet, a "T/A 4.9" callout on the shaker, 60 psi oil pump, and cam similar in grind to the  400 from the 1978–1979 model year were also included. Unfortunately, there were no improvements in the casting number "01" small-valve high-velocity heads, which would have yielded greater improvements in power. Additionally, the 301 W72 never received the option to come equipped with a manual transmission like the standard 301 received in 1979, and disappointingly, production for all Pontiac V8's ended soon after as GM sought to "corporatize" engine production.

Ram Air
The beginnings of Pontiac's iconic Ram Air dynasty began during the 1965 model year.  The GTO's new hood scoop design, with the inlets centrally located and mounted above the carburetor, provided the opportunity for experimentation.  Royal Pontiac developed the prototype of the package on their 1965 GTO drag car and Pontiac picked up the idea and in August 1965 Pontiac offered the new Fresh Air package to dealers consisting of the parts and instructions needed to make the hood scoop functional, including the metal tub to mount to the carburetors and rubber gasket to seal it to the underside of the hood. The Fresh Air package continued into the 1966 model year.

Around January 1966 Pontiac took the next step and began offering as a factory option the XS-code engine.  It included a new camshaft with duration increased from 288/302 (No. 068) to 301/313 (No. 744) and a new valve spring package with dampers to positively control valve action. Valve lift stayed at just over 0.400-inch with 1.5:1-ratio rocker arms.  The tri-power equipped XS-code 389 was shipped with the Ram Air pan in the trunk, and the dealer had to fit it and cut out the underside of the hood scoop to make it functional. The XS-code 389 was still rated at 360 bhp at 5,200 rpm, same as the more common WS-coded Tri-Power 389, but performance was noticeably improved on acceleration runs.  Pontiac engine production records report that 190 XS-code 389 engines were built during the 1966 model year. Whether all were installed in GTOs is unknown.

None of Pontiac's Ram Air engines actually enjoyed any true ram air effect.  The inlets were all well within the boundary layer that exists close to the surface, so all of these systems would more accurately be described as "outside air induction" systems, benefiting from the intake of cooler, and thus denser, outside air versus the comparatively hotter and less dense air under the car's hood.

Ram Air (1967- mid year 1968)
Simply called "Ram Air" by Pontiac it was the first in a series of engines available from Pontiac as regular production line options and officially called Ram Air. Its cast "670" heads had taller valve spring heights than the standard D-port heads, and the only 14-degree valve angle closed combustion chamber making these heads unique. It featured the "744" 301/313 camshaft, which offered more duration and overlap than the "HO". Along with the HO it also had Pontiac's famous cast-iron "headers", which were much better at reducing backpressure than the regular manifolds. The 670 heads were used until May 1967 when they were upgraded to become the "97" heads, which were then replaced late in the model year by the "997" heads which incorporated the upgrades of the "97" heads.

Ram Air II (1968 1/2)
The 1968 Ram Air II remained at 400 cu. in., again available only in the GTO and Firebird.  It was factory rated at 366 hp at 5,400 RPM and 445 lbs.ft. of torque at 3,800 RPM in the GTO, and 340 HORSEPOWER at 5,300 RPM and 430-lb.ft. of torque at 3,600 RPM in the Firebird, with only a small throttle restrictor tab on the Firebird being different.  It was the first engine that incorporated Pontiac's round-port head design in a production vehicle, however the intake port was the same as other D-port heads, leaving a head which exhaust port could nearly match the intake at high valve lifts. The Ram Air II also incorporated the first computer-designed camshaft. This camshaft sported a 308-/320-degree duration with  lift. This same camshaft was also used in Pontiac's 1969–1970 RA IV production cars. However, the RA II was limited to a 1.50:1 rocker ratio, while the RA IV used a 1.65:1 ratio, which yielded significantly greater total lift and, therefore, superior flow and power.

400 Ram Air (1969) / Ram Air (1970), aka Ram Air III 
Often called the "Ram Air III", this engine was officially called the "400 Ram Air" for 1969 and then simply "Ram Air" for the 1970 model year. It would later become known colloquially as the "Ram Air III", though Pontiac never called it by that name. A 400 cubic inch ram air equipped V8, it was an option on the 1969-70 GTO and Firebird Formula. For the 1969 and 1970 model years it was the standard engine in both the Firebird Trans Am and the GTO Judge. It was the same engine as the '67-'68 400 HO but for 1969 and 1970 it included a driver-selectable outside air induction system on the GTO(it was a separate option on Firebird), with the hood vents opened and closed using a knob located under the dash, below and to the right of the steering wheel, its bracket labeled "RAM AIR". It used the "744" camshaft (301-313) in the earlier manual trans versions, later downgraded to the "068" version, and the 288/302 duration cam with automatic transmission. Like previous generations of Ram Airs, it used Pontiac's special cast-iron "headers". It had 2-bolt main bearing caps in 1969, but went to a block similar to the Ram Air IV's in 1969 that was drilled for 4-bolt main bearing caps (but used a cast crank and cast rods). In 1970 the casting number #9799914 Ram Air 400 4-bolt main block also used the 4-bolt main caps on Ram Air applications.

Ram Air IV (1969-1970)
The Ram Air IV replaced the Ram Air II in 1969. It was called the Ram Air IV due to the planned use of four air inlets. Though production cars only got the two hood air inlets the name was retained. All 1968–69 #9792506 Ram Air 400 blocks have 4-bolt caps. The Ram Air IV used the Ram Air II's camshaft but lift in the Ram Air IV was increased to  thanks to the use of 1.65 ratio rocker arms (vs 1.50). The Ram Air IV heads had 1/8" taller intake ports, larger intake port volume with more airflow, yet shared the Ram Air II round exhaust ports. In addition, a shallower spherical-wedge combustion chamber moved the tuliped valve heads .040" closer to the piston at TDC, improving mixture draw considerably during the intake stroke. From 1969 though 1970, the Ram Air IV was available in both A-Body (GTO, including Judge) and F-body (Firebird, including Trans Am) form. While production of 1969–70 A-body Ram Air IV cars was low at just 1563 units(759 1969 GTOs including 302 Judges, and 804 1970 GTOs including 397 Judges) 1969 and 1970 model year F-body Ram Air IV cars were even rarer at just 245 total units produced. Only 157 Ram Air IV Firebirds, including 55 Trans Ams, were built for 1969. For 1970 the Trans Am was the only Firebird available with the Ram Air IV, and 88 were produced during the abbreviated 1970 F-body production run. A total of 1,808 Ram Air IV production cars were built over its 2-year production. Pontiac continued using its round-port cylinder-head design for 1971-'72 on the 455 HO. However, compression ratios were cut dramatically, marking the beginning of the end of the muscle car era.

Ram Air V
Though never factory-installed in any car, the ultimate engine of the Ram Air line of engines was the tunnel-port Ram Air V.  In 1969 Pontiac created four versions of the Ram Air V engine: a  short deck version for SCCA Trans-Am racing, a  variant for NASCAR, a  version for street use in GTOs and Firebirds, as well as a  adaptation for drag racing. The cylinder head design is similar to the Ford FE tunnel-port head used in the GT40 and Can-Am series racing. So large are the intake ports that the pushrods run through the center of each port via pressed-in tubes, in addition to streamlined airfoils over the tubes themselves to improve port shape, and increase flow velocity. The 303 had shorter connecting rods, smaller  journals and a solid lifter version of the Ram Air IV camshaft. The short deck engine weighed about  less than the other variants and had an 8000 rpm redline. T

While the exact total number of Ram Air V engines produced is not positively known, only about 25  engines were produced and about a dozen 428s and 366s. More  engines were produced by Pontiac than the other versions - estimates range from 80 to 200 units. Some 400s were dealer installed.

Parts for Ram Air V engines are not readily available.

Super Duty

SD 421
The 421SD was available in 1961 as a dealer option or over the counter then in 62 and 63 from the factory, and was fitted with a list of internal modifications designed solely to withstand the abuse of drag racing. Dual Carter Carburetor  #3433S (front) and #3435S (rear) carburetors with manual chokes and mechanical linkage. Factory heavy-duty high-pressure oil pump and eight-quart sump, four-bolt main bearing caps with Moraine aluminum bearings, and #1110976 dual-point distributor without vacuum advance. Casting No. 540306 featured  valves and was carried over from the previous model year, production stopped in March 1962 and then casting No. 544127 with larger  valves entered production. Neither casting was equipped with an exhaust crossover.

SD-455

Available only in the 1973 and 1974 Firebird Formula and Trans Am, the SD-455 consisted of a strengthened cylinder block that included 4-bolt main bearings and additional material in various locations for improved strength. Original plans called for a forged crankshaft, although actual production SD455s received nodular-iron crankshafts with minor enhancements. Forged rods and forged-aluminum pistons were specified, as were unique high-flow cylinder-heads. The very modest cam, combined with a low-compression ratio of 8.4 (advertised) and 7.9:1 actual resulted in  SAE NET. The initial press cars that were given to the various enthusiast magazines (e.g. HOT ROD and CAR AND DRIVER) were fitted with the Ram Air IV-spec camshaft and functional hood scoops - a fact that has been confirmed by several Pontiac sources. However, in the June 1974 issue of SUPER STOCK AND DRAG ILLUSTRATED, a new 1974 Trans Am with the SD-455 motor ran 14.25 @ . This was a completely stock car on loan from a private owner for the test. Pontiac listed the  rating at 4000 rpm for a motor that had a 5700 rpm redline on the factory tachometer. Various Pontiac sources have emphatically stated that NO  versions of the SD-455 were installed in regular production cars. The SD-455 motor was listed as an option in dealer brochures for the 1973 Grand Am and LeMans GTO(and planned for the Grand Prix as well) although none were produced for sale. Nevertheless, there appears in the October 72 issue of MOTOR TREND, a road test of a 1973 SD-455 Grand Am. 1975 Factory Service Manual lists the SD-455, but the SD-455 did not meet emissions for the 1975 model year and was canceled.

Experimental V8s

427 Hemi SOHC
This was a project started with the end goal of building a 427 Hemi. Pontiac asked Mopar (Chrysler, Dodge, Plymouth) for help in designing it and making it work. Surprisingly, Mopar actually agreed and sent over several of the engineers that designed both the 392 and 426 Hemi. The goal of making a Pontiac Hemi succeeded but the engine was never produced.

Features:
 Thin-wall, cast aluminum block
  bore x stroke, 8 cylinders, each having a bore of 4.342 inch and a stroke of 3.75 inch, results in a displacement of 444.21 cubic inches (7,279.34 cc); for the Pontiac OHC 427 Hemi refers to it as a "TOHC" and lists the bore at 4.257 inch—which, with a stroke of 3.75 inch, results in a displacement of very slightly more than 426.99 cubic inches (very slightly more than 6997.124 cc).
  main bearings
 Forged steel  rods (Ram Air V style)
 12:1 compression
 Mechanical Port Fuel Injection
 Large-valve heads (valve diameter):  intake,  exhaust
 Small-valve high-RPM head (valve diameter)  intake,  exhaust
 Splayed main caps, head bolts tie into main caps. Head bolts do not pull on the cylinder wall causing distortion.
 Cam drive: fiberglass belt
 Maximum RPM (high-RPM engine): over 8000 rpm 
 Engine weight: estimated  complete
 Dimensions:
 width ,
 length 
 height 
 Power: estimated  at 7500 rpm

Pontiac SOHC 421CID V8
Most likely prompted by its development of the Pontiac OHC six, the GM division built three different experimental SOHC 421 CID V8 engines in the early 1960s. According to the engineers who worked on the project, the SOHC 421 engines produced around 625 hp and were capable of turning 7,000 rpm.

One version of the engine featured camshafts driven off the front of the engine, another design had the cams driven by gears off the back of the engine. Apparently at least one of these engines survives under the hood of an engineer's personal Pontiac.

3 Valve SOHC

See also
 Pontiac Trophy 4 engine
 Pontiac straight-6 engine
 Pontiac straight-8 engine
 List of GM engines

References

V8
V8 engines
Gasoline engines by model